Charles Edward Cutts Birchall Appleton (16 March 1841 – 1 February 1879) was an Oxford don and scholarly entrepreneur.

He is best remembered for founding the periodical The Academy in 1869; it was intended a forum for an intellectual and cultural revival in the German style. The purpose was to encourage an elite with "sound information and correct taste in intellectual matters".

References

Science Serialized: Representation of the Sciences in Nineteenth-Century Periodicals By G. N. Cantor, Sally Shuttleworth. Published 2004 by MIT Press. 
https://www.oxforddnb.com/view/10.1093/ref:odnb/9780198614128.001.0001/odnb-9780198614128-e-595

1841 births
1879 deaths
Academics of the University of Oxford
People educated at Reading School
Alumni of St John's College, Oxford
Fellows of St John's College, Oxford
Humboldt University of Berlin alumni
19th-century British non-fiction writers